Seticosta ariadnae is a species of moth of the family Tortricidae. It is found in Loja Province, Ecuador.

The wingspan is 22.5 mm. The forewings are brownish, spotted with dark brown and more grey in the distal third. The costa and termen are dotted cream. The hindwings are greyish white, greyer on the periphery and strigulated (finely streaked) with grey.

Etymology
The species is named for the Greek goddess Ariadne who spun threads and refers to the thread-like lines of the forewings.

References

Moths described in 2004
Seticosta